John "Jack" Considine, Jr. is an American politician who served as a member of the Minnesota House of Representatives from 2015 to 2021.

Early life and education
Considine was born on Forbes Air Force Base in Topeka, Kansas. He earned a Bachelor of Arts degree from the University of Georgia.

Career
Considine was first elected to the Minnesota House of Representatives in 2014. A member of the Minnesota Democratic–Farmer–Labor Party (DFL), he represented District 19B in south-central Minnesota. Considine left office in 2021, succeeded by Luke Frederick.

Personal life
Considine is married to his wife, Kristine Madsen. They have two children and reside in Mankato, Minnesota. He previously served on Mankato's city council.

References

External links

Rep. Jack Considine official Minnesota House of Representatives website
Jack Considine official campaign website

Living people
Members of the Minnesota House of Representatives
21st-century American politicians
Year of birth missing (living people)